James Brown Plays New Breed (The Boo-Ga-Loo) is the twelfth studio album by American musician James Brown. The album was released in March 1966, by Smash Records.

Track listing
All tracks composed by James Brown and Nat Jones, except where indicated.

References

1966 albums
James Brown albums
Albums produced by James Brown
Smash Records albums